The canton of Tarn-Tescou-Quercy vert is an administrative division of the Tarn-et-Garonne department, in southern France. It was created at the French canton reorganisation which came into effect in March 2015. Its seat is in Labastide-Saint-Pierre.

It consists of the following communes:

Bruniquel 
Corbarieu
Génébrières
Labastide-Saint-Pierre
Léojac
Monclar-de-Quercy
Nohic
Orgueil
Puygaillard-de-Quercy
Reyniès
Saint-Nauphary
La Salvetat-Belmontet
Varennes
Verlhac-Tescou
Villebrumier

References

Cantons of Tarn-et-Garonne